W29 may refer to:
 W29 (weapon)
 Hansa-Brandenburg W.29, a 1918 German monoplane fighter floatplane 
 , a dredger
 Bay Bridge Airport
 Watkins 29, an American sailboat design